Human Nature is a 2006 album by the Canadian hard rock band Harem Scarem.

Track listing

Band members
Harry Hess - lead vocals, guitar, producer
Pete Lesperance - lead guitar, backing vocals, producer
Barry Donaghy - bass, backing vocals
Creighton Doane - drums, backing vocals

Charts

Release history

References 

2006 albums
Harem Scarem albums